The Columbia 8.3 is a sailboat that was designed by Alan Payne as a cruiser and first built in 1976.

The Columbia 8.3 design was also sold as the Hughes 27 and was later developed into the Hughes-Columbia 27.

Production
The design was built by Columbia Yachts in the United States and later by Hughes Boat Works in Canada after Howard Hughes bought Columbia Yachts. Production ran from 1976 until 1981, with 240 boats built.

Design
The designer described the Columbia 8.3's cruising design criteria, hull shape and sailing characteristics:

The Columbia 8.3 is a recreational keelboat, built predominantly of fibreglass, with wood trim. It has a masthead sloop rig, a raked stem, a slightly angled transom, an internally mounted spade-type rudder controlled by a tiller and a fixed fin keel. It displaces  and carries  of ballast.

The boat is fitted with a direct drive  Universal Atomic 4 gasoline engine for docking and manoeuvring. A  Swedish Volvo Penta geared diesel engine was available as a factory option.

The design has sleeping accommodation for four people, with a double "V"-berth in the bow cabin and two straight settee berths in the main cabin. The galley is located on both sides of the companionway ladder and is equipped with a two-burner stove to port and a sink and icebox to starboard. The head is located just aft of the bow cabin on the port side.

For sailing downwind the design may be equipped with a spinnaker.

See also
List of sailing boat types

References

External links

Photo of a Columbia 8.3

Keelboats
1970s sailboat type designs
Sailing yachts
Trailer sailers
Sailboat type designs by Alan Payne
Sailboat types built by Columbia Yachts
Sailboat types built by Hughes Boat Works